Kuh Miran (also Romanized as Kūh Mīrān; also known as Komīrān) is a village in Afriz Rural District, Sedeh District, Qaen County, South Khorasan Province, Iran. At the 2006 census, its population was 140, in 29 families.

References 

Populated places in Qaen County